Phyllonorycter maererei is a moth   of the family Gracillariidae. It is found in Tanzania and Yemen in dry areas but with low green vegetation at altitudes between 500 and 1,000 meters.

The length of the forewings is 2.1 mm. The forewing is elongate and the ground colour is golden ochreous with white markings. The hindwings are pale grey with a silver shine. Adults are on wing in April and July.

Etymology
The species is named in honour of Professor Amon Petro Maerere of the Department of Crop Science and horticulture at the Sokoine University of Agriculture in Tanzania. He is the father of an entomologist and agronomist Peter Amon Maerere.

References

Moths described in 2012
maererei
Moths of the Arabian Peninsula
Insects of Tanzania
Moths of Africa

Taxa named by Jurate de Prins